Wayneflete Tower, also known as Waynflete's Tower, is an historical gatehouse located in Esher, near London. Part of the Palace of Esher established in 1462 by Bishop William Waynflete of Winchester, it was connected to the keep by a curtain wall. Demolition in the 17th century removed furnishings and granite blocks. In the 18th century, the tower was made part of a Gothic mansion house by William Kent for new owner Henry Pelham. The tower is a Grade I listed building.

See also 
 Esher Place

References

Bibliography 
 
 
 Wessex Archaeology report on the Time Team investigation

Grade I listed buildings in Surrey
Gatehouses (architecture)